Hungary competed at the 1924 Summer Olympics in Paris, France, returning to the Olympic Games after not being invited to the 1920 Games because of the nation's role in World War I. 89 competitors, 86 men and 3 women, took part in 54 events in 12 sports.

Medalists

The following Hungarian competitors won medals at the games. In the discipline sections below, the medalists' names are bolded.

| width=78% align=left valign=top |

Default sort order: Medal, Date, Name

| style="text-align:left; width:22%; vertical-align:top;"|

Multiple medalists
The following competitors won multiple medals at the 1924 Olympic Games.

Aquatics

Swimming

Ranks given are within the heat.

 Men

 Women

Water polo

Hungary made its second Olympic water polo appearance.

Roster
 István Barta
 Tibor Fazekas
 Lajos Homonnai
 Márton Homonnai
 A. Ivády
 F. Kann
 Alajos Keserű
 Ferenc Keserű
 B. Nagy
 József Vértesy
 János Wenk

First round

Quarterfinals

Bronze medal quarterfinals

Bronze medal semifinals

Athletics

Sixteen athletes represented Hungary in 1924. It was the nation's sixth appearance in the sport as well as the Games. Somfay took Hungary's only athletics medal in Paris, with the silver in the pentathlon.

Ranks given are within the heat.

Boxing 

A single boxer represented Hungary at the 1924 Games. It was the nation's debut in the sport. Lőwig lost his only bout.

Cycling

Four cyclists represented Hungary in 1924. It was the nation's second appearance in the sport.

Road cycling

Ranks given are within the heat.

Track cycling

Ranks given are within the heat.

Fencing

Ten fencers, nine men and one woman, represented Hungary in 1924. It was the nation's fourth appearance in the sport; Hungary was one of nine nations to have women compete in the first Olympic fencing event for women.

The team competitions resulted in two medals for Hungary. In somewhat of a disappointment for Hungary, the sabre team failed to win the gold medal; it was the first time a Hungarian sabre team competed but did not win. The finals match against Italy proved decisive, as both Hungary and Italy beat the other two teams in the final. Hungary and Italy split the individual bouts in their match, with eight apiece. The tie-breaker for the match, and thus the gold medal, was number of touches between Hungary and Italy; Italy won 50 to 46. The foil team earned the country's first non-sabre fencing medal, winning the bronze.

The Hungarian men had success in the individual sabre competition, with three of the four Hungarians reaching the final. Pósta and Garai were both in the three-way tie-breaker for medal placement, finishing first and third respectively. Schenker finished fourth, and was also the only Hungarian man to compete individually in another weapon; he was eliminated in the first round of the foil.

Tary, representing Hungary in the women's foil competition, reached the final and placed sixth overall.

 Men

Ranks given are within the pool.

 Women

Ranks given are within the pool.

Football

Hungary competed in the Olympic football tournament for the second time in 1924, losing their second-round match to Egypt.

 Round 1

 Round 2

Final rank 9th place

Rowing

Seven rowers represented Hungary in 1924. It was the nation's third appearance in the sport.

Ranks given are within the heat.

Shooting

Seven sport shooters represented Hungary in 1924. It was the nation's third appearance in the sport. Halasy took the nation's only shooting medal in 1924, a gold in the trap.

Tennis

 Men

 Women

 Mixed

Wrestling

Greco-Roman

 Men's

References

External links
Official Olympic Reports
International Olympic Committee results database

Nations at the 1924 Summer Olympics
1924
Olympics